The Chinese Taipei women's football championship is the top level women's football league in the Republic of China. The league is organized by the Chinese Taipei Football Association.

Teams
The 2011 season was played by the following 6 teams:

 Hsing Wu College
 Hsing Wu High School
 New Taipei City
 National Taiwan Normal University (NTNU) Feiyang
 National Taiwan Sports University (NTSU)
 Soccer Soul

The 2012 season was played by the following 8 teams:

 ANL Mulan (ANL木蘭)
 Chiayi Yung County Ching High School
 Taipei SCSC
 Hsing Wu College
 Hsing Wu High School
 New Taipei City
 National Taiwan Normal University (NTNU)
 National Taiwan Sport University (NTSU)

Format
The league features six or seven teams per year that play each other twice (2008) or thrice (2009) to decide the champion.

Champions
The champions so far are:
 1999 Wei Da
 2000 Wei Da
 2001
 2002
 2003
 2004
 2005 Hsing Wu
 2006 Fei Yang
 2007 
 2008 Shida Yei Fang 
 2009 Taipei SCSC
 2010 Shida
 2011 Taiwan Sports University
 2012

References

Chinese Taipei
Women's football in Taiwan
Women's sports leagues in Taiwan